Niels Rasmussen (27 May 1922 – 12 January 1991) was a Danish rower. He competed at the 1948 Summer Olympics in London with the men's eight where they were eliminated in the round one repêchage.

References

1922 births
1991 deaths
Danish male rowers
Olympic rowers of Denmark
Rowers at the 1948 Summer Olympics
People from Nordfyn Municipality
European Rowing Championships medalists
Sportspeople from the Region of Southern Denmark